Woodland Hills School District is a public school district located in Allegheny County, Pennsylvania, serving twelve municipalities in the Pittsburgh area; Braddock, Braddock Hills, Chalfant, Churchill, East Pittsburgh, Edgewood, Forest Hills, North Braddock, Rankin, Swissvale, Turtle Creek and Wilkins Township (except for a small portion).

According to 2000 federal census data, it serves a resident population of 52,876.

Woodland Hills School District was formed in July 1981 by a mandated merger of Edgewood, General Braddock, Swissvale, Churchill and Turtle Creek school districts. The Woodland Hills School District is unique in that it was formed by a court order (one of only three such districts so formed in Pennsylvania) in 1982 as a result of a Civil Rights Act lawsuit filed by various residents of the prior school districts. It was formed from an amalgamation of seven separate districts in the eastern region of Allegheny County in suburban Pittsburgh. The suit was filed to address the fact that the seven districts were all composed almost exclusively of all white or all black student enrollments. This resulted in African American students being transported long distances past all White schools and vice versa. The resultant court order created a single large school district of over 7,000 students comprised almost equally of white and black students.

Woodland Hills School District is bordered by eight other school districts:  Pittsburgh S.D., Penn Hills S.D., Gateway S.D., East Allegheny S.D., Wilkinsburg Borough S.D.  Also bordering (but across the Monongahela River from) Woodland Hills School District, is:  West Mifflin S.D., Steel Valley S.D., and Duquesne City S.D.  Woodland Hills School District's sports size classification is "AAAAA" (5A), which is the second largest of the PIAA's six classifications (single A through 6A).

Schools
As of the fall of 2018, Woodland Hills School district serves approximately 3,500 students, and has five facilities:
Woodland Hills Junior / Senior High School (7–12)
Woodland Hills Intermediate School (4-6)
Edgewood Elementary School (preK-5)
Wilkins Elementary School (preK-5)
Woodland Hills Academy (K-8)

Demographics
61.9% – African American/Non Hispanic
27.5% – White/Non-Hispanic
0.8% – Asian/Pacific Islander
2.6% – Hispanic
0.3% – American Indian/Alaska Native

Extracurricular activities

Sports
Woodland Hills High School's athletics department sponsors almost thirty varsity sports. Woodland Hills competes in the AAAA division of the WPIAL.

Varsity sports include Baseball, Boys/Girls Basketball, Boys/Girls Bowling, Boys/Girls Cross Country, Field Hockey, Boys Golf, Rifle, Boys/Girls Soccer, Softball, Boys/Girls Swimming, Boys/Girls Tennis, Boys/Girls Track, Boys/Girls Volleyball, Wrestling, Rugby, and Ultimate.

The Wolvarena is the football stadium for the Woodland Hills Wolverines. It has been named one of the top 10 places to watch high school football in the country. The Wolverines very rarely lose a home game, losing only 2 out of 40 since 1993. Its most successful varsity team is its football team led by head coach George Novak, which won the regional AAAA championship in 1996, 1999, 2001, 2002, and 2009. Since 1987, Woodland Hills has sent 50 players to Division I schools
 
The Woodland Hills Rifle Team has won state championships for the last 4 years. It has also won multiple WPIAL championships. It is coached by Matt Rodrigues, Chuck Pantalone and Maria Brucker.

The Woodland Hills boys track and field team tied for first place for the WPIAL section 4A championships in 2001.  The team was coached by former Olympian Lindel Hodge.

Performing arts
Woodland Hills High School prides itself in its yearly staging of popular musicals each spring and has won several Gene Kelly Awards for its performances. In April 2007, WHHS students performed in the student version of Les Misérables.
Woodland Hills also has a Marching Band for students in the high school. Every year the spring musical receives nominations from the Gene Kelly Awards for outstanding Pittsburgh-area high school performances.

1988 – Fiddler on the Roof
1989 – Hello, Dolly!
1990 – Anything Goes
1991 – Guys and Dolls*
1992 – Li'l Abner*
1993 – Peter Pan*
1994 – Annie Get Your Gun
1995 – Jesus Christ Superstar
1996 – The Mystery of Edwin Drood
1997 – The Music Man*
1998 – Man of La Mancha*
1999 – The Pirates of Penzance*
2000 – The King and I
2001 – On the Twentieth Century
2002 – Evita
2003 – Hello, Dolly!*
2004 – Anything Goes
2005 – Seussical
2006 – Pippin
2007 – Les Misérables
2008 – Beauty and the Beast
2009 – The Wizard of Oz*
2010 - Annie
2011 - The Phantom of the Opera*
2012 - Curtains
2013 - Young Frankenstein
2014 - Sweeney Todd
2015 - The Mystery of Edwin Drood
2016 - Peter Pan*
2017 - Spamalot
2018 - The Drowsy Chaperone
2019 - Mamma Mia!*

*Denotes Gene Kelly Award for Best Musical

Other events include the winter show done by the Performing Arts Class.  Recent productions have included "1776," "Jekyll and Hyde" and "Miss Saigon."

Notable alumni
Steve Breaston: NFL Wide Receiver for Kansas City Chiefs, and Arizona Cardinals.  Attended and played for the University of Michigan.
Rob Gronkowski: NFL Tight End for New England Patriots, and Tampa Bay Buccaneers. Attended and played for the University of Arizona.
Terrence Johnson: NFL Cornerback for Atlanta Falcons, Indianapolis Colts, and New England Patriots. Attended and played at California University of Pennsylvania.
Summer Lee: Democratic representative for the 34th district of the Pennsylvania House of Representatives
Wes Lyons: NFL Wide Receiver for Pittsburgh Steelers, and Spokane Shock. Attended and played at the West Virginia University.
Lousaka Polite: NFL Fullback for Atlanta Falcons, New England Patriots, Miami Dolphins, Chicago Bears, and Dallas Cowboys.  Attended and played for the University of Pittsburgh.
Miles Sanders: NFL running back for the Philadelphia Eagles. Attended and played at Penn State University.
Shawntae Spencer: NFL Cornerback for Oakland Raiders, and San Francisco 49ers.  Attended and played for the University of Pittsburgh.
Jason Taylor: NFL Defensive End for Miami Dolphins, Washington Redskins, and New York Jets.  Attended and played for the University of Akron.
Joy Taylor: Fox Sports Reporter
Darrin Walls: NFL Cornerback for New York Jets, and Atlanta Falcons.  Attended and played at Notre Dame University.

References

School districts established in 1981
Education in Pittsburgh area
School districts in Allegheny County, Pennsylvania
1981 establishments in Pennsylvania